Singsås is a former municipality in the old Sør-Trøndelag county, Norway. The  municipality existed from 1841 until its dissolution in 1964. Singsås municipality encompassed the eastern part of what is now the municipality of Midtre Gauldal in Trøndelag county. The administrative center was the village of Singsås, where the Singsås Church is located.

History
In 1841, the western district (population: 1,272) of the old municipality of Holtaalen was split off to form a separate municipality called Singsaas (under the recently passed formannskapsdistrikt law). On 1 January 1875, an unpopulated area of Singsås municipality made up of rural farmland and mountains was transferred to the neighboring municipality of Budal. During the 1960s, there were many municipal mergers across Norway due to the work of the Schei Committee. On 1 January 1964, the municipalities of Budal (population: 529), Singsås (population: 1,554), Soknedal (population: 1,916), and Støren (population: 2,296) were all merged to form the new municipality of Midtre Gauldal.

Government
All municipalities in Norway, including Singsås, are responsible for primary education (through 10th grade), outpatient health services, senior citizen services, unemployment and other social services, zoning, economic development, and municipal roads. The municipality is governed by a municipal council of elected representatives, which in turn elects a mayor.

Municipal council
The municipal council  of Singsås was made up of representatives that were elected to four year terms. The party breakdown of the final municipal council was as follows:

See also
List of former municipalities of Norway

References

Midtre Gauldal
Former municipalities of Norway
1841 establishments in Norway
1964 disestablishments in Norway